George Joachim Goschen, 1st Viscount Goschen, PC, DL, FBA (10 August 1831 – 7 February 1907) was a British statesman and businessman best remembered for being "forgotten" by Lord Randolph Churchill. He was initially a Liberal, then a Liberal Unionist before joining the Conservative Party in 1893.

While Chancellor of the Exchequer, in 1888, he introduced the Goschen formula to allocate funding for Scotland and Ireland.

Background, education and business career
He was born in London, the son of Wilhelm Heinrich (William Henry) Goschen, who emigrated from Leipzig. His grandfather was the prominent German printer Georg Joachim Göschen.  He was educated at Rugby under Tait, and at Oriel College, Oxford, where he took a first in Literae Humaniores. He entered his father's firm of ″Frühling & Göschen″, of Austin Friars, in 1853, and three years later became a director of the Bank of England. From 1874 to 1880, Goschen was Governor (Company chairman) of the Hudson's Bay Company, North America's oldest company (established by English royal charter in 1670).

Political career, 1863–1885
In 1863 he was returned without opposition as one of the four MPs for the City of London in the Liberal interest, and he was reelected in 1865. In November of the same year he was appointed Vice-President of the Board of Trade and Paymaster-General, and in January 1866 he was made Chancellor of the Duchy of Lancaster, with a seat in the cabinet. When Gladstone became prime minister in December 1868, Goschen joined the cabinet as President of the Poor Law Board, until March 1871, when he succeeded Childers as First Lord of the Admiralty. In the 1874 general election he was the only Liberal returned for the City of London, and by a narrow majority. Being sent to Cairo in 1876 as delegate for the British holders of Egyptian bonds in 1876, he concluded an agreement with the Khedive to arrange for the conversion of the debt.

In 1878 his views on the county franchise question prevented him from voting consistently with his party. With the City of London becoming more Conservative, Goschen did not stand there at the 1880 general election, but was instead returned for Ripon in Yorkshire, which he represented until 1885, when he was returned for Edinburgh East. He declined to join Gladstone's government in 1880 and refused the post of Viceroy of India, but he became special ambassador to the Porte, where he settled the Montenegrin and Greek frontier questions in 1880 and 1881. He was made an Ecclesiastical Commissioner in 1882. When Sir Henry Brand was raised to the peerage in 1884, Goschen was offered the role of Speaker of the House of Commons, but he declined. During the parliament of 1880–1885 he frequently found himself at odds with his party, especially over franchise extension and questions of foreign policy. When Gladstone adopted Home Rule for Ireland, Goschen followed Lord Hartington (afterwards 8th Duke of Devonshire) and became one of the most active of the Liberal Unionists. He failed to retain his seat for Edinburgh at the election in July of that year.

Political career, 1885–1895
On the resignation of Lord Randolph Churchill in December 1886, Goschen, though a Liberal Unionist, accepted Lord Salisbury's invitation to join his ministry as Chancellor of the Exchequer. Churchill had assumed he could not be replaced and famously commented that he had "forgotten Goschen" was a potential alternative. Goschen needed a seat in Parliament and so stood in a by-election in the Liverpool Exchange constituency but was defeated by seven votes in January 1887. He was then elected for the strongly-Conservative St George's, Hanover Square, in February. His chancellorship was memorable for his successful conversion of the National Debt in 1888. He also introduced the first UK road tax, implemented in the form of two vehicle duties, on locomotives and carts.

According to Roy Jenkins, a former Chancellor of the Exchequer, "Whether Goschen was a good Chancellor is more problematical. His main and real achievement was the conversion in 1888 of the core of the national debt from a 3 percent to a 2.75 percent and ultimately 2.5 percent basis. For the rest he was a stolid and uninnovating Chancellor." Professor Thomas Skinner wrote, "Yet there remains a feeling that he failed to accomplish much of what needed to be done".

The University of Aberdeen again conferred upon him the honour of the rectorship in 1888, he received an honorary LL.D from the University of Cambridge in the same year, and he received a similar honour from the University of Edinburgh in 1890.

Following the defeat of Salisbury's government in 1892, Goschen moved into opposition. Though he had been a leading Liberal Unionist as Chancellor of the Exchequer, Goschen did not stand against Joseph Chamberlain for the leadership of the party in 1892 following the departure of Hartington to the House of Lords as the Duke of Devonshire. Unable to work with Chamberlain, Goschen left the Liberal Unionists and joined the Conservatives in 1893. One obvious sign of his change of allegiance within the Unionist alliance was when he joined the exclusively Conservative Carlton Club in the same year.

Political career, 1895–1907

From 1895 to 1900 Goschen was First Lord of the Admiralty. He retired in 1900 and was raised to the peerage as Viscount Goschen of Hawkhurst, Kent. Though retired from active politics he continued to take a great interest in public affairs, and when Chamberlain started his tariff reform movement in 1903, Lord Goschen was one of the weightiest champions of free trade on the Unionist side.

Other public positions
In educational subjects Goschen had always taken the greatest interest, his best known, but by no means his only, contribution to popular culture being his participation in the University Extension Movement. His first efforts in parliament were devoted to advocating the abolition of religious tests and the admission of Dissenters to the universities. His published works indicate how ably he combined the wise study of economics with a practical instinct for business-like progress, without neglecting the more ideal aspects of human life. In addition to his well-known work on The Theory of Foreign Exchanges, he published several financial and political pamphlets and addresses on educational and social subjects, among them being,The Cultivation of the Imagination, Liverpool, 1877, and that on Intellectual Interest, Aberdeen, 1888. He was President of the Royal Statistical Society, 1886–88.

He also wrote a biography of his grandfather, The Life and Times of George Joachim Goschen, publisher and printer of Leipzig (1903).  This culminated a long-standing project to refute allegations of Jewish ancestry, giving his earliest ascertainable ancestor as a Lutheran pastor named Joachimus Gosenius, recorded in 1609. (It did not apparently prevent his family being classed as of Jewish origin in the German genealogical work known as The Semi Gotha, first published 1913.)

Private life
Goschen died on 7 February 1907. He had married, in 1857, Lucy, the daughter of John Dalley, and had 6 children. He was succeeded by his eldest son George (1866–1952), who was Conservative M.P. for East Grinstead from 1895 to 1906 and married a daughter of Lord Cranbrook.

Cultural references
 Goschen appears as a minor character in the historical-mystery novel Stone's Fall, by Iain Pears.
 He is referenced in the poem Away from It All by New Zealand poet A. R. D. Fairburn:
I want to leave behind me all rancid emotion.
I want to be alone. I want to forget Goschen.

References

Further reading
Archive.org (sign in to access books and to link footnotes)
The Times (of London) archives
Thomas J. Spinner: George Joachim Goschen: the transformation of a Victorian liberal, Cambridge: Cambridge University Press, 1973  
Goschen, George: The Life and Times of Georg Joachim Goschen, Vol. I, New York: G. P. Putnam, 1903
Goschen, George: The Life and Times of Georg Joachim Goschen, Vol. II, New York: G.P. Putnam, 1903
Arthur D. Elliot: The life of George Joachim Goschen, First Viscount Goschen, 1831–1907. 2v. London: Longmans Green, 1911

External links 

 
 

1831 births
1907 deaths
Alumni of Oriel College, Oxford
Chancellors of the Duchy of Lancaster
Chancellors of the Exchequer of the United Kingdom
Chancellors of the University of Oxford
British classical liberals
Fellows of the Royal Society
First Lords of the Admiralty
Liberal Party (UK) MPs for English constituencies
Scottish Liberal Party MPs
Liberal Unionist Party MPs for Scottish constituencies
Liberal Unionist Party MPs for English constituencies
Conservative Party (UK) MPs for English constituencies
People educated at Rugby School
Presidents of the Royal Statistical Society
Rectors of the University of Edinburgh
Rectors of the University of Aberdeen
UK MPs 1859–1865
UK MPs 1865–1868
UK MPs 1868–1874
UK MPs 1874–1880
UK MPs 1880–1885
UK MPs 1885–1886
UK MPs 1886–1892
UK MPs 1892–1895
UK MPs 1895–1900
UK MPs who were granted peerages
Members of the Parliament of the United Kingdom for Edinburgh constituencies
Governors of the Hudson's Bay Company
People educated at Blackheath Proprietary School
Ambassadors of the United Kingdom to the Ottoman Empire
Members of Parliament of the United Kingdom for the City of London
Politics of Edinburgh
George Goschen, 1st Viscount Goschen
British people of German descent
Deputy Lieutenants of Kent
Members of the Privy Council of the United Kingdom
Fellows of the British Academy
Presidents of the Oxford Union
Peers of the United Kingdom created by Queen Victoria
George 1